John Dean (born 22 December 1947) is a New Zealand former cyclist. He competed at the 1968 Summer Olympics and the 1972 Summer Olympics.

He won the overall sportsperson of the year award at the Taranaki Sports Awards in 1966 and was named the 1967 Road Cyclist of the Year at the annual meeting in Wellington of the New Zealand Amateur Cycling Association. Dean also won the New Zealand National Road Race Championships in 1967.

References

External links
 

1947 births
Living people
New Zealand male cyclists
Olympic cyclists of New Zealand
Cyclists at the 1968 Summer Olympics
Cyclists at the 1972 Summer Olympics
Sportspeople from New Plymouth
Cyclists at the 1974 British Commonwealth Games
Commonwealth Games competitors for New Zealand
20th-century New Zealand people